Brickellia hebecarpa is a Mexican species of flowering plants in the family Asteraceae. It is native to western Mexico, the states of Colima, Michoacán, and Jalisco.

Brickellia hebecarpa is a branching shrub up to 150 cm (5 feet) tall with purple flower heads  borne on short side branches.

References

External links
Photo of herbarium specimen at Missouri Botanical Garden collected in Michoacán

hebecarpa
Flora of Mexico
Plants described in 1884